The Antelope Range is a mountain range in Elko and White Pine counties, Nevada.

The range was named for the wild antelope which roamed the area.

References 

Mountain ranges of Nevada
Mountain ranges of Elko County, Nevada
Mountain ranges of White Pine County, Nevada